Rajendra Gehlot is an  Indian politician. He was elected to the  Rajasthan Legislative Assembly from Sardarpura as a member of the  Bharatiya Janata Party. He is the Member of Parliament in Rajya Sabha from Rajasthan since June 2020.

References

Living people
Members of the Rajasthan Legislative Assembly
Bharatiya Janata Party politicians from Rajasthan
People from Jodhpur
Year of birth missing (living people)
Indians imprisoned during the Emergency (India)
Rajya Sabha members from Rajasthan